The 2017–18 season was the 107th season in Hajduk Splits history and their twenty-seventh in the Prva HNL. Their 3rd-place finish in the 2016–17 season means it was their 27th successive season playing in the Prva HNL.

First-team squad
For details of former players, see List of HNK Hajduk Split players.

Competitions

Overall record

Prva HNL

Classification

Results summary

Results by round

Results by opponent

Source: 2017–18 Croatian First Football League article

Matches

Friendlies

Pre-season

On-season

Mid-season

Prva HNL

Source: Croatian Football Federation

Croatian Cup

Source: Croatian Football Federation

Europa League

Second qualifying round

Third qualifying round

Play-off round 

Source: uefa.com

Player seasonal records
Updated 6 March 2021

Top scorers

Source: Competitive matches

Clean sheets

Source: Competitive matches

Disciplinary record

Sources: Prva-HNL.hr, UEFA.com

Appearances and goals

Sources: Prva-HNL.hr, UEFA.com

Overview of statistics

Transfers

In

Total spending:  350.000 €

Out

Total income:  10.200.000 €

Total expenditure:  9.850.000 €

Promoted from youth squad

Loans in

Loans out

1 Loan was terminated on 10 February 2018

Sources: Glasilo Hrvatskog nogometnog saveza

Notes

References

2017-18
Croatian football clubs 2017–18 season
2017–18 UEFA Europa League participants seasons